The 2008–09 Davidson Wildcats men's basketball team represented Davidson College in NCAA men's Division I competition. The Wildcats had emerged in recent years as a legitimate national power despite being a mid-major school with one of the smallest student bodies in the NCAA Division I.  The team was given high expectations after advancing to the NCAA tournament Elite Eight in 2008.

This season was highlighted by the individual performance of Stephen Curry, who was the nation's leading scorer after making the switch from Shooting Guard to Point Guard positions.  He averaged 28.6 Points per Game and 5.6 Assists per Game. Stephen this season also took the title of all-time leading career point-scorer from former All-American John Gerdy. A few months after the season, Stephen announced his entry into the 2009 NBA Draft, ending his Davidson career.

The season was ended on a disappointing note, as the Wildcats unexpectedly lost to College of Charleston in the SoCon Tournament semifinals, resulting in their omission from the NCAA basketball tournament Field.  The Wildcats then beat the South Carolina Gamecocks in the NIT tournament before losing in the Round of 16 to Saint Mary's and their star Point Guard Patty Mills.

Roster

Schedule and results

|-
!colspan=9 style=| Regular season
|-

|-
!colspan=9 style=|SoCon Tournament 
|-

|-
!colspan=9 style=|National Invitation Tournament 
|-

Rankings

Awards and honors
Stephen Curry – National Scoring Leader, Consensus First-team All-American, SoCon Player of the Year

Team Players in the 2009 NBA draft

References

Davidson Wildcats men's basketball seasons
Davidson
Davidson
Southern Conference men's basketball champion seasons
2008 in sports in North Carolina
Wild